Vidin Municipality is a municipality (obshtina) in Vidin Province, Northwestern Bulgaria, located along the right bank of Danube river in the Danubian Plain. It is named after its administrative centre - the city of Vidin which is also the capital of the province.

The main road E79 crosses the area, connecting the province centre of Vidin with the city of Montana and respectively with the western operating part of Hemus motorway.

Settlements 

Vidin Municipality includes the following 34 places (towns are shown in bold):

Demography 
The following table shows the change of the population during the last four decades. Since 1992 Vidin Municipality has comprised the former municipality of Dunavtsi and the numbers in the table reflect this unification.

Ethnicity
According to the 2011 census, among those who answered the optional question on ethnic identification, the ethnic composition of the municipality was the following:

Religion 
According to the latest Bulgarian census of 2011, the religious composition, among those who answered the optional question on religious identification, was the following:

An overwhelming majority of the population of Vidin Municipality identify themselves as Christians. At the 2011 census, 84.3% of respondents identified as Orthodox Christians belonging to the Bulgarian Orthodox Church.

See also
Provinces of Bulgaria
Municipalities of Bulgaria
List of cities and towns in Bulgaria

References

External links
 Official website